Nouadhibou (Berber: Nwadibu,) is the second largest city in Mauritania and serves as a major commercial centre. The city itself has about 118,000 inhabitants expanding to over 140,000 in the larger metropolitan area. Nouadhibou is consequently located merely a couple of kilometres from the border between Mauritania and Morocco. Its current mayor is Elghassem Ould Bellali, who was installed on 15 October 2018.

Overview 

The city consists of four major areas: the city centre, including the airport; Numerowatt to the north; Cansado, the main residential area, to the south; and a dormitory town for the workers of the harbour facilities which are located a few kilometers south of the city, near the tip of the Ras Nouadhibou peninsula, at Port Minéralier.

Attractions in Nouadibou include the Table Remarquable, several markets, a ships' graveyard and Mediterranean monk seals.

The port of Nouadhibou is the final resting place of over 300 ships and hence the world’s largest ship graveyard. Unlike the arrival en masse of ships at Mallows Bay, here the number of craft has built up over time, as corrupt officials accepted bribes from boat owners to allow them to dump their vessels in the area.

Nouadhibou has always been an important transit point for international transport.
In the beginning of the 20th century, it was a stopover for the Latécoère air-transport network for mail and passengers for western Africa and overseas colonies like Martinique. Antoine de Saint-Exupery spent much time there as a pilot and as writer.

Processing iron ore forms the largest industry in Nouadhibou, although the overall major economic activity is fishing.

History
The town was established as a small fishing port, controlled by the Portuguese, the Dutch and finally the French. In 1907 by decree of the governor general of French West Africa Ernest Roume, it was renamed Port-Étienne after the former French Minister of the Colonies Eugène Étienne. After Mauritania became independent in 1960, the town name changed to Nouadhibou.

On 30 June 1973, at the time of the second-longest solar eclipse in the 20th century, an Aerobee rocket was launched at Nouadhibou for solar research.

From February 2006 onwards Nouadhibou has become the departure point for African migrants trying to reach the Canary Islands. This extremely dangerous route to reach the European Union has become popular as a result of increased emigration controls along the Moroccan-controlled coast and around the Spanish enclaves of Ceuta and Melilla in the second half of 2005.

The city is reputedly also a centre of trading of meteorites found in the Sahara.

Population history

Climate
Nouadhibou features a hot desert climate (BWh) under the Köppen climate classification. The city sees virtually no rainfall during the course of the year averaging a paltry  annually. Despite the fact that it features a hot desert climate, the area does not quite see the extreme temperatures that other areas with this climate feature because of strong maritime influences, which also causes a seasonal lag in the warmer months.

Transportation

Paved roads
Nouadhibou is linked with the Coastal Motorway RN2 to the capital Nouakchott (a distance of ) and by highway to the Western Saharan border in the north (a distance of ).

Railway
Nouadhibou also is connected by railway to the iron mines in Zouérat, 670 km to the east. The freight trains can be as long as 3 km, reputedly the longest in the world. The railway also carries passengers and calls at Choum.

Aviation
The city is served by Nouadhibou Airport.

Ship graveyard
Over 300 ships lie abandoned along the coast around Nouadhibou.

Economy
Plans were drawn up at the beginning of 1963 to build a port called Port Wharf in the fishing harbour, which included the construction of industrial and trade buildings. This became operational in 1966. This wharf was designed to accommodate traffic of up to 50,000 tonnes. In 1977 the wharf was lengthened to provide 3 extra berths for ships of average tonnage raising its capacity to 320,000 tonnes.

Health
The Nouadhibou Regional Hospital was opened in 2017 after a build time of five years and is the largest hospital in that region

Sports
Two football clubs based in Nouadhibou participate in the Mauritanian Premier League as of the 2018–19 season: FC Nouadhibou and ASC Snim.

References

External links 

 Adventures of Mauritania
 Shipwrecks on the coast of Mauritania

 
Dakhlet Nouadhibou Region
Regional capitals in Mauritania
Communes of Mauritania
Railway stations in Mauritania
Ship graveyards
Ship disposal